José María Martín de Herrera y de la Iglesia (26 August 1835 in Aldeadávila de la Ribera, Spain – 8 December 1922 in Santiago de Compostela, Spain) was a long-serving cardinal in the Roman Catholic Church in the early years of the twentieth century. Unusually, he served as archbishop of dioceses in more than one different country, being both archbishop of Santiago de Cuba and of Santiago de Compostela during his career in the Church.

Ordained in September 1859, José María Martín quickly showed his ability in theology and canon law. However, rather than become a theology professor he spent the following seventeen years in pastoral work before he was chosen as an Archbishop of Santiago de Cuba (in those days given to someone from Spain) at the relatively young age of forty (at the same time he was in the running to become Auditor of the Roman Rota).

Although he was aided by several other prominent Spaniards in administering his Cuban diocese, José María Martín was eventually returned to Spain in the more prestigious role of Archbishop of Santiago de Compostela in 1889. He was elevated to Cardinal by Pope Leo XIII in 1897 and participated in the 1903 and 1914 papal conclaves. However, by the time of the 1922 conclave Cardinal Martín was much too old to travel to Rome and thus he excused himself from participating. He died in December of that year.

External links
 Biography

19th-century Spanish cardinals
Spanish Roman Catholic bishops in North America
Archbishops of Santiago de Compostela
1835 births
1922 deaths
19th-century Roman Catholic archbishops in Cuba
20th-century Spanish cardinals
Cardinals created by Pope Leo XIII
University of Salamanca alumni
19th-century Roman Catholic archbishops in Spain
Roman Catholic archbishops of Santiago de Cuba